The 2022 South Yorkshire mayoral election took place on 5 May 2022 to elect the Mayor of South Yorkshire, the leader of the South Yorkshire Mayoral Combined Authority. It took place alongside other local elections across the United Kingdom. The Labour Party candidate, Oliver Coppard, won the election in the second round with 71.4% of the vote.

Background 
In 2018, The South Yorkshire metro mayor position- then known as the Sheffield City Region- had its inaugural election. At the time of its creation, the metro mayor's role was an effectively powerless position, with no salary. It was named this originally because its boundaries went beyond the four boroughs of South Yorkshire and included some parts of Derbyshire and Nottinghamshire. However, these areas did not become constituent parts. Its lack of power was because the borough councils of Doncaster and Barnsley opposed the creation of the mayoralty and the combined authority (then Sheffield City Region Combined Authority). They instead favoured a 'One Yorkshire' devolution deal, which would have a Mayor for all of Yorkshire in 2020. Dan Jarvis, MP for Barnsley Central won this role with at second preferences. He has remained as a Member of Parliament during this term.

In late-2019, Jarvis secured a deal between the four boroughs, the combined authority and the British government. In 2020, the role was provided with a salary and statutory powers, this was fully implemented by 2021. These powers include: transport, strategic planning, coordinating investment and skills as well as £30 million annual funding for 30 years. Jarvis reportedly does not take the salary and donates it.

Think Tank IPPR has reported that the mayor, much like other metro mayors in the North of England have utilised power beyond the remit given by the government. In South Yorkshire, for instance, the country's first 'ownership hub' was built to help businesses become worker owned or co-operatives. Controversy arose in June 2021 when Jarvis' administration voted to continue a privatised bus service in South Yorkshire, despite previous pledges to bring it into public control.

Electoral system
South Yorkshire, along with other elected mayoralties in England, will use the supplementary vote system, in which voters express a first and second preference of candidates.

 If a candidate receives over 50% of the first preference vote the candidate wins.
 If no candidate receives an overall majority, i.e., over 50% of first preference votes, the top two candidates proceed to a second round and all other candidates are eliminated. 
 The first preference votes for the remaining two candidates stand in the final count. 
 Voters' ballots whose first and second preference candidates are eliminated are discarded.
 Voters whose first preference candidates have been eliminated and whose second preference candidate is in the top two have their second preference votes added to the count. 
This means that the winning candidate has the support of a majority of voters who expressed a preference among the top two.

All registered electors (British, Irish, Commonwealth and European Union citizens) living in the combined authority area aged 18 or over on 5 May 2022 are entitled to vote in the mayoral election.

Speculation has circulated that the government may remove the supplementary vote system which mayoralties use and replace it with first-past-the-post- in line with general elections.

Candidates
Oliver Coppard was selected as the Labour Party candidate for the election. Dan Jarvis confirmed in September 2021 that he will not stand for a second term in the mayoralty in 2022. Seven candidates applied for selection, which was narrowed down to a setlist of four candidates: Rachael Blake, Lewis Dagnall, Oliver Coppard and Jayne Dunn. The voting period for Labour members took place in January 2022. On 26 January, Oliver Coppard was announced as their candidate.

Simon Biltcliffe, an entrepreneur from Barnsley, was announced as the Yorkshire Party candidate on 22 October 2021.

The Green Party selected Bex Whyman as their candidate for mayor on 20 December 2021.

The Conservative Party selected Clive Watkinson as their candidate.

The Liberal Democrats selected Joe Otten, a Sheffield councillor, as their candidate on 29th March.

The Social Democratic Party selected David Bettney as their candidate on the 4 April 2022. He was endorsed by Reform UK.

Results

References 

South Yorkshire
Mayoral elections in England